The 1998 season was the Minnesota Vikings' 38th in the National Football League (NFL). The Vikings became the third team in NFL history to win 15 games during the regular season, which earned them the National Football Conference (NFC) Central division championship and the first overall seed in the NFC playoffs. The team entered the playoffs as the favorite to win Super Bowl XXXIII, but their season ended when they were upset by the Atlanta Falcons in the 1998 NFC Championship Game.

The 1998 Vikings team is known for its offense, which featured veteran quarterback Randall Cunningham, running back Robert Smith, and Hall of Fame wide receivers Cris Carter and rookie Randy Moss. The team scored an NFL record 556 points during the season, and Moss set an NFL record by catching 17 touchdown passes, the most ever by a rookie. On special teams, Gary Anderson became the first placekicker in NFL history to convert every field goal and extra point he attempted. The Vikings defense ranked sixth in the league in points allowed and was led by Hall of Fame defensive tackle John Randle.

During the NFC Championship Game, Gary Anderson missed a field goal for the first time that season. Had the field goal been converted, it would have given the Vikings a nearly insurmountable 10-point lead late in the game. Instead, the Falcons tied the game on their ensuing drive and won by a field goal in sudden death overtime.

The 1998 Vikings were the first NFL team to compile a regular season record of 15–1 and not reach the Super Bowl. Their loss in the NFC Championship Game is also considered by their fans to be one of the most devastating losses in NFL history.

Offseason

1998 Draft

Preseason

Regular season

Prior to the start of the 1998 season, the Vikings were sold to Red McCombs. The NFL had not been happy with the Vikings' ownership arrangement of 10 owners with none owning more than 30 per cent. The ownership decided to sell the club. At first it appeared that Tom Clancy would become the new owner. However, his attempt to buy the team fell through. So in July 1998, the team was sold to McCombs, who was from San Antonio, Texas.

1998 was a year to remember for the Minnesota Vikings. With a spectacular offense led by quarterback Randall Cunningham, who had the best year of his NFL career, running back Robert Smith, veteran wide receiver Cris Carter, and explosive rookie Randy Moss, the Vikings set a then-NFL record by scoring a total of 556 points, never scoring fewer than 24 in a game. The Vikings finished the season 15–1, their only loss by three points to the Tampa Bay Buccaneers in week nine. 12 of their 15 wins came by a margin of at least 10 points.

According to Football Outsiders, "The Vikings led the league with 52 plays of 25+ yards. They had 22 offensive plays of 40+ yards; no other team had more than 16 plays of that length."

Schedule

Note: Intra-division opponents are in bold text.

Game summaries

Week 1: vs. Tampa Bay Buccaneers

Cris Carter and rookie Randy Moss caught two touchdowns apiece as the Vikings routed the Bucs 31–7 despite being outgained in yards 319 to 298.

Week 2: at St. Louis Rams

Brad Johnson was intercepted twice and eventually knocked out of the game; his replacement Randall Cunningham threw a late touchdown to Cris Carter. Robert Smith rushed for 179 yards and two touchdowns as the Rams stayed within a touchdown despite four Tony Banks interceptions. A last-minute goalline stand by the Vikings sealed a 38–31 win.

Week 3: vs. Detroit Lions

Cunningham made his first start of the season and threw for 220 yards and a five-yard score to Randy Moss. The game was mostly a Gary Anderson field goal exhibition as he booted five field goals plus two PATs, the second on Leroy Hoard's 11-yard rushing touchdown in the Vikings 29–6 win.

Week 4: at Chicago Bears

Cunningham and Erik Kramer of the Bears squared off in a spirited duel. Cunningham's four touchdowns (to Smith, Andrew Glover, Carter, and Moss) were answered by Kramer's four scores (to Bobby Engram, Chris Penn, and Ryan Wetnight). The Vikings got the better of the duel as they intercepted Kramer once and won 31–28.

Week 5: at Green Bay Packers

Randall Cunningham and Randy Moss unleashed a passing clinic on Monday Night at Lambeau Field as Cunningham tossed for 442 yards and Moss caught five passes for 190 yards and two scores (Moss also had a 75-yard touchdown reception called back due to holding). Cris Carter added eight for 119 yards as the Vikings also intercepted Brett Favre three times; backup Doug Pederson took over and threw two scores in the fourth quarter, but they did nothing to assuage a 37–24 Vikings win.

Week 7: vs. Washington Redskins

Week 8: at Detroit Lions

Week 9: at Tampa Bay Buccaneers

The Vikings' quest for perfection ended as Warrick Dunn and Mike Alstott ran for 243 rushing yards and two scores. Two Cunningham touchdown throws put the Vikings up 24–17 until Alstott's score in the fourth quarter proved the key to Tampa's 27–24 upset of the Vikings.  The win was the third in six tries for Bucs coach Tony Dungy over his former boss Dennis Green.

Week 10: vs. New Orleans Saints

Cunningham threw only two passes against New Orleans and Brad Johnson came off the bench to throw for 316 yards and a touchdown despite two picks; Sammy Knight ran back one pick for a 91-yard touchdown in the fourth. Robert Smith rushed for 137 yards; he and Leroy Hoard accounted for three touchdowns in Minnesota's 31–24 win.

Week 11: vs. Cincinnati Bengals

Week 12: vs. Green Bay Packers

Week 13: at Dallas Cowboys

Cunningham and Moss led a wild 46–36 win at Dallas as Moss caught just three passes – for 163 yards and three touchdowns. Cris Carter snagged seven passes for 135 yards and a score and Leroy Hoard ran in two more touchdowns. Troy Aikman threw for a career-high 455 yards and a score to Patrick Jeffers while Emmitt Smith ran in three scores; despite 513 total yards the Cowboys could not keep pace with the Vikings. The game was also a penalty-laden affair with a combined 23 fouls eating 230 yards.

Week 14: vs. Chicago Bears

Four years after Warren Moon's overtime win over the Bears on Sunday Night Football, the Vikings clinched the NFC Central title by once again hosting the Bears on Sunday Night Football. Randall Cunningham unleashed four more touchdowns, three of them to Randy Moss. Leroy Hoard added a rushing score while the Bears fumbled at the Vikings six-yard line and Dwayne Rudd scored with the turnover. The Vikings won 48–22.

Week 15: at Baltimore Ravens

Vikings offensive coordinator Brian Billick faced his employer for the following season as the two teams combined for just 143 rushing yards. This unusual game featured three kick-off returns for TDs and four fumbles (all in their own half by the Ravens) in just the first 21 minutes of play. Overall, the Ravens coughed up five fumbles but the Vikings offense was largely held in check, with Gary Anderson booting six field goals and Randall Cunningham held to two touchdowns, one to Randy Moss. Future 49ers coach Jim Harbaugh threw a 42-yard touchdown to his former Colts teammate Floyd Turner while Corey Haris, David Palmer on kick returns and Priest Holmes on a two-yard run gave the Ravens the rest of their points scored in a 38–28 Vikings win.

Week 16: vs. Jacksonville Jaguars

Despite giving up 108 penalty yards, the Vikings reached 50 points for only the sixth time in franchise history and the first time since 1974 in a 50–10 win over the AFC Central champion Jacksonville Jaguars. Randall Cunningham threw for 210 yards and three touchdowns, then gave way to Brad Johnson who added a touchdown of his own. Cunningham was one of three Vikings players who rushed for 161 yards and a Chuck Evans touchdown while Jimmy Hitchcock intercepted Jonathan Quinn and scored from 30 yards out.

Week 17: at Tennessee Oilers

The Vikings became the final club to play against Tennessee before they officially became the Titans. The Oilers clawed to a 13–8 halftime lead despite an intentional grounding penalty against Steve McNair that led to a safety. Two Randall Cunningham touchdowns in the third quarter put the game away to a 26–16 Vikings win, the 15th of the season. With this loss the Oilers became the first team in NFL history to have three straight 8-8 seasons.

Standings

Postseason
In the playoffs, the Vikings rolled past the Arizona Cardinals 41–21, and came into the Metrodome heavily favored for their NFC title showdown with the Atlanta Falcons, who had finished 14–2. Leading 20–7 just before halftime, some would argue that the Vikings got greedy with their playcalling, as they called a deep pass play on third down, which led to a Cunningham fumble deep in Minnesota territory. Shortly thereafter, the Falcons scored to cut the lead to 20–14. The Vikings were again leading 27–20 with two minutes left in the fourth quarter and had a chance to potentially put the game out of reach with a field goal. However, kicker Gary Anderson, who had gone 35 for 35 in the regular season, missed a 39-yard attempt from the left hash. He pulled it left. With multiple defensive injuries for the Vikings the Falcons subsequently marched downfield and scored the game-tying touchdown several plays later.

A controversial decision in the game saw Vikings head coach Dennis Green instruct quarterback Randall Cunningham to take a knee on a third down deep in Viking territory with about 30 seconds remaining rather than risk having to punt back to Atlanta following their game-tying touchdown. Minnesota won the coin toss in overtime but failed to score in two overtime possessions. Atlanta eventually won 30–27 in overtime after Morten Andersen's 38 yard field goal.

Schedule

Game summaries

NFC Divisional Round: vs (#6) Arizona Cardinals

NFC Championship Game: vs (#2) Atlanta Falcons

The 16–1 Vikings, boasting the league's first post-merger, 500-point offense since the 1983 Washington Redskins, were heavy favorites at Hubert H. Humphrey Metrodome and raced to a 20–7 lead in the second quarter off two Randall Cunningham touchdowns (one rushing and a throw to Randy Moss), but at the end of the first half Chris Chandler found Terance Mathis for a 14-yard score. After a Morten Andersen field goal made it 20–17 in the third, the Vikings moved back out to a 10-point lead on another Cunningham TD throw (this one to Matthew Hatchette). In the final 10 minutes of regulation, the Falcons were forced to turn the ball over on downs, but the Vikings fumbled it right back and Andersen kicked another field goal for a 27–20 score. In the final four minutes, Gary Anderson, who had not missed a field goal all season, shanked a 38-yarder, to give the Falcons a chance. Chandler led the Falcons downfield and connected with Mathis in the end zone with 49 seconds remaining. The Vikings got the ball in overtime but Eugene Robinson stopped a deep pass to Moss and the Falcons got it back on a punt. Chandler led the Falcons downfield again and Andersen nailed a 38-yard field goal at 11:52 of the extra quarter; the 30–27 final sent the Falcons to Super Bowl XXXIII.

Statistics

Team leaders

 Vikings single season record.

Best performances
 Randall Cunningham, 442 passing yards vs. Green Bay (October 5)
 Randy Moss, 3 receptions, 163 yards, 3 TD at Dallas (November 26)

League rankings

Staff

Roster

Awards and records
 Randall Cunningham, Bert Bell Award
 Randy Moss, led rookies in receiving yards (1,313 yards). Moss also set the record for most receiving touchdowns for a rookie, 17, a record that still stands today.
 The Vikings became just the third team to post a 15–1 win–loss record since the implementation of the 16-game schedule in 1978. They joined the 1984 San Francisco 49ers and the 1985 Chicago Bears, but became the first of those teams to fail to win the Super Bowl. 
 To date, the only teams to complete a 15–1 season (or better) are the 1984 San Francisco 49ers, the 1985 Chicago Bears, the 1998 Minnesota Vikings, the 2004 Pittsburgh Steelers, the 2007 New England Patriots, the 2011 Green Bay Packers and the 2015 Carolina Panthers. Only the 49ers and Bears capped their seasons with a Super Bowl victory, while the Packers were the only one of the group not to win a playoff game.
 The Vikings' high-powered offense set a record, which stood until the 2007 season, for most points scored in a season with 556. They eclipsed the 1983 Washington Redskins, who scored 541. The 2007 New England Patriots beat the record by scoring 589 points. The 1998 Vikings now rank fifth all time, behind the 606 points scored by the 2013 Denver Broncos. It is worth noting that the 1998 Vikings followed in the footsteps of the 1983 Redskins and set a mark the 2007 Patriots and 2013 Broncos matched: none of these teams won the Super Bowl (in fact, the Vikings are the only one of these four squads not to have won their conference championship).

References

External links
Pro Football Reference
NFC Championship

Minnesota Vikings seasons
Minnesota
NFC Central championship seasons
Minnesota